Year 135 (CXXXV) was a common year starting on Friday (link will display the full calendar) of the Julian calendar. At the time, it was known as the Year of the Consulship of Lupercus and Atilianus (or, less frequently, year 888 Ab urbe condita). The denomination 135 for this year has been used since the early medieval period, when the Anno Domini calendar era became the prevalent method in Europe for naming years.

Events 
<onlyinclude>

By place

Roman Empire 
 A Jewish diaspora begins, as Emperor Hadrian bars Jews from Jerusalem, and has survivors of the massacre dispersed across the Roman Empire. Many join Mediterranean ports.
 Jerusalem is renamed Colonia Aelia Capitolina, in honor of Hadrian. Legio VI Ferrata rebuilds the legionary fortress in the city, and constructs a Roman temple at Golgotha.
 An altar to Jupiter is erected, on the site of the Temple in Jerusalem.
 Canopus, Hadrian's Villa, Tivoli, Italy, is finished.
 Alans threaten Cappadocia; they are repulsed by Arrian.

Asia 
 Last (4th) year of Yangjia era of the Chinese Han Dynasty.

By topic

Births 
 He Jin, Chinese Grand Marshal and regent (d. 189)
 Judah ha-Nasi, Talmudic scholar (according to Jewish tradition, he was born the same day Rabbi Akiva died a martyr's death) (d. 217)
 Marcus of Jerusalem (or Mahalia), bishop of Jerusalem (d. 156)
 Sanabares, Indo-Parthian king (d. 160)

Deaths 
 Epictetus, Greek Stoic philosopher (b. AD 50)
 Rabbi Akiva, Jewish scholar and sage (b. AD 50)
 Rabbi Ishmael, Jewish scholar and lawmaker
 Simon bar Kokhba, Jewish military leader

References